Princess Alexandra may refer to:

Alexandra the Maccabee (63–28 BC) of the Hasmonean Kingdom 
Princess Alexandra of Denmark (1844–1925), oldest daughter of King Christian IX of Denmark, Queen consort of Edward VII
Grand Duchess Alexandra Georgievna of Russia (1870–1891), born Princess Alexandra of Greece and Denmark, firstborn daughter of George I of Greece
Princess Alexandra of Saxe-Coburg and Gotha (1878–1942), granddaughter of Victoria of the United Kingdom
Princess Alexandra of Hanover and Cumberland (1882–1963), second eldest daughter of Ernest Augustus, Crown Prince of Hanover and Princess Thyra of Denmark
Princess Alexandra Victoria of Schleswig-Holstein-Sonderburg-Glücksburg (1887–1957), wife of Prince August Wilhelm of Prussia
Princess Alexandra, Duchess of Fife (1891–1959), granddaughter of Edward VII of the United Kingdom
Princess Alexandra of Yugoslavia (1921–1993), daughter of Alexander I of Greece, Queen consort of Peter II of Yugoslavia
Princess Alexandra, The Honourable Lady Ogilvy (born 1936), granddaughter of George V of the United Kingdom
Alexandra Prinzessin von Hannover (born 1937), wife of Prince Welf Henry of Hanover
Alexandra, Countess of Frederiksborg (born 1964), formerly Princess Alexandra of Denmark, the former wife of Prince Joachim of Denmark
Princess Alexandra of Greece (born 1968), eldest daughter of Prince Michael of Greece and Denmark
Princess Alexandra of Sayn-Wittgenstein-Berleburg (born 1970), eldest daughter of Princess Benedikte of Denmark
Alexandra von Fürstenberg (born 1972), sister of Marie-Chantal, Crown Princess of Greece, sometimes referred to as Princess Alexandra of Fürstenberg
Princess Alexandra of Luxembourg (born 1991), only daughter of Henri, Grand Duke of Luxembourg
Princess Alexandra of Hanover (born 1999), youngest daughter of Ernst August V, Prince of Hanover and Caroline, Princess of Hanover,  Princess of Monaco